The 1909 TCU football team represented Texas Christian University (TCU) as a member of the Texas Intercollegiate Athletic Association (TIAA) during the 1909 college football season. Led by Jesse R. Langley in his second and final year as head coach, TCU compiled an overall record of 5–2–1.

Schedule

References

TCU
TCU Horned Frogs football seasons
TCU football